Barkot is a town, near Uttarkashi and a nagar palika in Uttarkashi District in the state of Uttarakhand, India. It is located on the banks of the Yamuna river.

Geography
It has an average elevation of 1,220 metres (4,003 feet).

Barkot is located in the bank of Yamuna river.

Demographics
 India census, Barkot had a population of 16568. Males constitute 53% of the population and females 47%. Barkot has an average literacy rate of 84.5%, higher than the national average of 74%; with 93% of the males and 77% of females literate. 54% of the population is under 6 years of age.

References

External links
 Barkot at WikiMapia

Cities and towns in Uttarkashi district